Carrico is a surname. Notable people with the surname include:

Charles William Carrico Sr. (born 1961), American politician
Dale Carrico, American rhetorician
Daniel Carriço (born 1988), Portuguese footballer
David Carrico, contributing author to the 1632 series of alternate history novels
Harry L. Carrico (1916–2013), American jurist
Joseph E. Carrico (c. 1925 - November 3, 1988), American management consultant and tennis official
Marcellus Washington Carrico, founder of the El Paso Times newspaper
Mother Mary Paul Carrico, first president of Mount St. Clare College, now Ashford University
William "Bill" N. Carrico Jr., an entrepreneur and computer scientist from California
Carriço (footballer) (born 1943), Portuguese footballer

Portuguese-language surnames